Yuanqu may refer to:

 Yuanqu (元曲), another name for the qu form of Chinese verse
 Yuanqu County (垣曲县) in Yuncheng, Shanxi
 Yuanqu County (冤句), in Shandong during China's imperial period